Sudeticeratidae is one of nine families of the Pericycloidea superfamily. They are an extinct group of ammonoid, which are shelled cephalopods related to squids, belemnites, octopuses, and cuttlefish, and more distantly to the nautiloids.

References
 The Paleobiology Database accessed on 10/01/07

Goniatitida families
Pericyclaceae